Sidsjö-Böle IF is a Swedish football club located in Sundsvall.

Background
Sidsjö-Böle IF currently plays in Division 4 Medelpad which is the sixth tier of Swedish football. They play their home matches at the Sidsjövallen in Sundsvall.

The club is affiliated to Medelpads Fotbollförbund.

Season to season

Footnotes

External links
 Sidsjö-Böle IF – Official website
 Sidsjö-Böle IF on Facebook

Sport in Västernorrland County
Football clubs in Västernorrland County
1957 establishments in Sweden